Gobulus is a genus of gobies native to the Atlantic and Pacific coasts of the Americas.

Species
There are currently four recognized species in this genus:
 Gobulus birdsongi Hoese & Reader, 2001
 Gobulus crescentalis (C. H. Gilbert, 1892) (Crescent goby)
 Gobulus hancocki Ginsburg, 1938 (Sandtop goby)
 Gobulus myersi Ginsburg, 1939 (Paleback goby)

References

Gobiidae